Excelsior Rotterdam, commonly known as Excelsior, is a Dutch professional football club based in Rotterdam, Netherlands. They play in the Eredivisie, the top tier of Dutch football from the 2022–23 season following promotion. The club was founded on 23 July 1902 and was formerly known as "Rotterdamse Voetbal en Atletiek Vereniging Excelsior" (Rotterdam Football and Athletics Club Excelsior). Excelsior's home stadium is the Stadion Woudestein – for sponsorship reasons known as the Van Donge & De Roo Stadion – which has a capacity of about 4,500, one of the smallest stadiums hosting professional football in the Netherlands.

History

Early history
Excelsior were officially formed on 23 July 1902 as Rotterdamse Voetbal en Atletiek Vereniging Excelsior. However, the initial founders of the club, a group of close friends located in the Kralingen district of Rotterdam, were already playing their football matches together on the fields of the eighteenth century buitenplaats Woudesteyn. After the actual establishment of the club, the municipality officially gave permission to use the land. As football was still an elite sport at the beginning of the 20th century, Excelsior became one of the first working class clubs in the Netherlands.

First successes
In the season 1945–46, Excelsior gained their first success by promoting to the Eerste Klasse, the highest tier of Dutch football before professional football was introduced in 1954. The deciding match against VUC was played in De Kuip and attracted 52.000 spectators. Excelsior relegated in the next season, but managed to promote for the second time in the season 1951–52. After the introduction of professional football, Excelsior won the Eerste Divisie championship three times (1974, 1979 and 2006) and promoted to the Eredivisie various times, usually to relegate not long afterwards.

Excelsior once reached the KNVB Cup final in the season 1929–30, but lost the match to fellow Rotterdam club Feyenoord (0–1). Excelsior's biggest pre-war achievement was the win of the Zilveren Bal trophy. Excelsior beat Feyenoord (5–0) in the finals of the highly rated pre-season tournament.

Founding father of Dutch professional football
In the mid-fifties, Excelsior were the leading club behind the introduction of professional football in the Netherlands. When the KNVB continued to refuse payments in football, Excelsior chairman Henk Zon and board member Aad Libregts managed to persuade association president Hans Hopster, in cooperation with the directors of Feyenoord, Sparta and ADO Den Haag. In August 1954 the KNVB accepted the proposal and professional football was introduced in the Netherlands.

Pioneers
Being the smallest professional club in Rotterdam, Excelsior always had to be creative to survive. This creativity made Excelsior play a pioneering role within Dutch football. In 1958 Excelsior became the first Dutch club with covered stands. Later, in 1974, Excelsior also were the first Dutch club with shirt advertising. Against the then existing rules, the club put an 'A' on the shirt. The character was supposed to stand for 'Team A', but in reality it stood for Akai, the company of main investor Rob Albers. The KNVB decided to ban the 'A' from the shirt and it would take until 1982 for shirt advertising to be introduced. Akai would adorn the shirts of Excelsior until the season 1999–00.

Millennium
In 2002, the year in which the club was officially 100 years old, Excelsior returned to the 
Eredivisie. They did this after spending more than 20 years in the second tier of Dutch football. They were relegated after one season. In the 2005/2006 season Excelsior became champions of the Eerste Divisie and were promoted back to the Eredivisie once again.

Between 1997 and 2005 Excelsior had a partnership with Rotterdam rivals Feyenoord. Excelsior became Feyenoord's satellite club. As such, Feyenoord gave Excelsior money and players (either on loan or free transfer).

A majority of the Excelsior fans have always been against a partnership with Feyenoord. Michel van der Neut, chairman of Excelsior's supporters club, claimed: "Excelsior sold her soul with the extended partnership. Excelsior simply stops existing this way."

Recent history
In 2010 Excelsior returned to the highest tier of Dutch football, after defeating crosstown rival Sparta Rotterdam in the final of the Eredivisie promotion/relegation play-offs. The team was mostly composed by Feyenoord loanees and was coached by former Feyenoord youth coach Alex Pastoor. In the 2010–11 season Excelsior made a flying start in the Eredivisie, gaining ten points in its first five matches, including a home victory in the Rotterdam derby against Feyenoord (3–2). In the remainder of the season, Excelsior upset some of the larger league teams at home, winning against AZ and getting draws against Groningen and eventual league champions Ajax. In the final match of the regular season, Excelsior got a 4–1 win away at Vitesse Arnhem, a result that left them one goal short of staying up. Finishing 16th, Excelsior had to face FC Den Bosch and Helmond Sport in the relegation / promotion play-offs. A 4–2 home win against Helmond sport ensured another season of Eredivisie football for Excelsior.

Excelsior finished bottom of the table in the Eredivisie at the end of the 2011–12 season, managing only four wins in 34 matches. The club was again relegated to the Eerste Divisie and has had ups and downs since. In the 2022–23 season Excelsior will be playing in the Eredivisie after being relegated in 2019.

Stadium

Excelsior's home venue is Stadion Woudestein, which has a capacity of 4,500 seats, one of the smallest stadiums hosting professional football in the Netherlands.

The club had two short spells at different locations. For the season 1907–08 Excelsior played on the Afrikaanderplein. After returning to Woudestein, Excelsior moved to the Toepad terrain for seasons 1922–39. When the Dutch government decided to build marine barracks on the Toepad area right before the start of the second world war, Excelsior moved back to the familiar Woudestein.

In the early nineties Excelsior went through a difficult period. The club barely survived a financial crisis, but a newly appointed board under the chairmanship of Martin de Jager had one important goal; a new Excelsior stadium. Various plans were made, one of them being a joint stadium for Excelsior and Sparta, but eventually none of the plans were implemented. Due to financial pressure, Excelsior decided to take the plunge and started renovating Woudestein themselves. The club built two new stands themselves and with the help of the municipality the main stand got renovated as well, including business seats and office space. On 31 July 2000, the new stadium was opened with a friendly match against Feyenoord.

When Excelsior promoted to the Eredivisie after the season 2009–10, the club decided to replace the grass surface with artificial turf. Main reason for the change was the lack of financial resources to install under-soil heating, which is mandatory for clubs participating on the highest level of Dutch football.

Supporters and rivalries

Paper recycling club
Excelsior is known as the Oud papier-club (paper recycling club), because former chairman Henk Zon often used to collect old paper in order to secure the financial position of the club.

Mascot
Since 2008 'Woutje Stein' is the official Excelsior mascot. He is named after the Woudestein-stadium.

Rivalries
Rotterdam is the city with the most professional teams in the Netherlands. Besides Excelsior there are Feyenoord and Sparta Rotterdam.

Rivalry against Feyenoord
Ever since the clubs used to work together Excelsior players and supporters have grown a more serious rivalry against Feyenoord. The majority of Excelsior supporters never wanted a cooperation with Feyenoord in the first place. On 22 May 2009, Excelsior supporters hosted a funeral as they felt like their club's identity had died due to the partnership with Feyenoord.

In 2017 Excelsior won against Feyenoord (3–0), resulting in the latter not winning the Eredivisie title on that day. This resulted in riots.

Rivalry against Sparta
Excelsior is from the Kralingen-neighbourhood and Sparta Rotterdam is from the Spangen-neighbourhood. Both clubs are not always playing in the Eredivisie, hence they play matches against each other in both the Eredivisie and the Eerste Divisie. The Feyenoord partnership Excelsior had in the past has resulted in more hatred from Sparta Rotterdam supporters.

One of the more spectacular matches between Excelsior and Sparta was the 2010 derby. Excelsior managed to gain promotion to the Eredivisie by winning against Sparta in the 94th minute of the match.

Honours

League
 Eerste Divisie
Winners (3): 1973–74, 1978–79, 2005–06
Promotion (4): 1969–70, 1981–82, 2001–02, 2009–10, 2013–14, 2021–22

 Tweede Divisie
Promotion (1): 1968–69

Domestic results
Below is a table with Excelsior's domestic results since the introduction of the Eredivisie in 1956.

Current squad

Out on loan

Player of the year
The Excelsior 'Player of the Year' award is voted for by the club's supporters, in recognition of the best overall performance by an individual player throughout the football season. The annual election is organized by the supporters club Pro Excelsior since 1996.

Managers

Current staff

Former managers

Notable former players

The players below had senior international cap(s) for their respective countries. Players whose name is listed represented their countries while playing for Excelsior.

 Brett Holman
 Thomas Buffel
 Gill Swerts
 Michel Bastos
 Sebastián Pardo
 Patrick Mtiliga
 Marc Nygaard
 Jordan Botaka
 Christian Gyan
 David Connolly
 Salomon Kalou
  Mounir El Hamdaoui
 Mario Been
 George Boateng
 Winston Bogarde
 Royston Drenthe (youth)
 Tim Vincken
 Ferry de Haan
 Oscar Moens
 Robin van Persie (youth)
 Graeme Rutjes
 Andwelé Slory
 Gaston Taument
 Luigi Bruins
 Kamohelo Mokotjo
 Ahmad Mendes Moreira
 Nol van der Vin

References

External links

 Official website 
 Excelsior Fans 
 Excelsior Fansite 

 
Football clubs in the Netherlands
Football clubs in Rotterdam
Excelsior
1902 establishments in the Netherlands